Microchip  Technology Inc. is a publicly listed American corporation that manufactures microcontroller, mixed-signal, analog, and Flash-IP integrated circuits. Its products include microcontrollers (PIC, dsPIC, AVR and SAM), Serial EEPROM devices, Serial SRAM devices, embedded security devices, radio frequency (RF) devices, thermal, power and battery management analog devices, as well as linear, interface and wireless products.

Its corporate headquarters is located in Chandler, Arizona. Its wafer fabs are located in Tempe, Arizona, Gresham, Oregon, and Colorado Springs, Colorado. The company's assembly/test facilities are in Chachoengsao, Thailand, and Calamba and Cabuyao, Philippines. Sales for the fiscal year ending on March 31, 2022 were US$6.82 billion.

Microchip Technology offers support and resources to educators, researchers and students in an effort to increase awareness and knowledge of embedded applications. Support includes access to labs, curricula and course materials, one-on-one consultations, online resources (e.g., code examples, textbook recommendations), training at regional training centers, silicon donations, assistance finding low cost development tools, free versions of Microchip programming tools and product discounts.

Products 
Microchip Technology was founded in 1987 when General Instrument spun off its microelectronics division as a wholly owned subsidiary.
The newly formed company was a supplier of programmable non-volatile memory, microcontrollers, digital signal processors, card chip on board, and consumer integrated circuits.
An initial public offering later in the year was canceled because of the October 1987 stock market crash.
Microchip Technology became an independent company in 1989 when it was acquired by a group of venture capitalists led by Sequoia Capital.
In the same year, Microchip Technology announced the release of small, inexpensive 8-bit reduced instruction set computing (RISC) microcontrollers for $2.40 apiece whereas most RISC microcontrollers were 32-bit devices selling for hundreds of dollars.

In 1990, 60% of Microchip Technology's sales were from the disc drive industry and the product portfolio relied heavily on commodity EEPROM products.
The company was losing US$2.5 million per quarter, had less than 6 months of cash in reserve, had exhausted lines of credit, and was failing to control expenses.
Early in the year, the venture capital investors accepted an offer to sell Microchip Technology to Winbond Electronics Corporation of Taiwan for $15M. Winbond Electronics backed out of the deal after the Taiwanese stock market decrease in May 1990. Vice President of Operations, Steve Sanghi, was named president and chief operating officer of Microchip Technology in 1990.
After several quarters of losses, Sanghi oversaw Microchip Technology's transition from selling commodity-based products to specialized chips, such as the RISC technology.

Microchip Technology conducted an IPO in 1993, which Fortune magazine cited as the best performing IPO of the year with a stock appreciation of 500% and over $1bn in market capitalization.
At the end of 2015, Microchip Technology posted its 100th consecutive quarter of profitability. 
In-line with the general consolidation of the semiconductor industry, Microchip Technology purchased 17 semiconductor manufacturers from 2007 through 2017.

Microchip Technology offers 8-bit microcontrollers, 16-bit PIC microcontrollers, dsPIC digital signal controllers, 3analog and interface products, security authentication products, timing/communication/real-time clock and calendar products, real-time clock and calendar devices, memory products, wireless products, high-throughput USB and Ethernet interfaces, MOST technology, embedded controllers and super I/O devices, touch, multi-touch and 3D gesture control products, power over Ethernet systems and ICs, and field programmable gate arrays (FPGAs).

8-bit microcontrollers
Microchip Technology's 8-bit portfolio consists of over 1,200 devices constructed under two architectures: PIC microcontrollers or AVR microcontrollers. Key features of the 8-bit microcontrollers are Core Independent Peripherals, low-power performance with picoPower and eXtreme Low Power (XLP) technology and EMI/EMC performance.

16-bit microcontrollers
The 16-bit microcontrollers, such as the PIC24, offer an upgrade over the 8-bit devices in features and peripherals (e.g., more memory, additional pins). The 16-bit microcontrollers are constructed under the PIC microcontroller architecture.

32-bit microcontrollers
Microchip Technology's 32-bit product portfolio run at up to 600 DMIPs with up to 2048 KB Flash and 512 KB RAM with 32 MB integrated DDR2 dynamic random-access memory (DRAM) or 128 MB externally addressable options. The 32-bit portfolio addresses advanced graphics and Internet of things (IoT) applications.

32-bit microprocessors
The 32-bit Arm microprocessors were designed for applications beyond the 32-bit microcontrollers with 600MHz (942 DMIPS) operation, support for up to 512 MD of external DDR2 or DDR3 DRAM and power down to 0.3mW sleep. Available peripherals and users interfaces include gigabit Ethernet MAC addresses, USBs, hardware video decoding, capacitive sensing, 12-bit CMOS sensors, I²S audio interfaces and 24-bit graphic LCD controllers with overlays.

Analog and interface products
Microchip Technology offers a broad portfolio of analog products that address thermal management, power management, battery management, mixed-signal, linear, interface, safety and security needs. Products includes stand-alone analog and interface devices which support a variety of bus interfaces and analog features on microcontrollers, digital signal controllers, microprocessors and FPGAs. The power products include silicon diodes, MOSFETs, insulated-gate bipolar transistors, silicon carbide MOSFETs and Schottky diodes.

Digital signal controllers
The dsPIC product family of digital signal controllers includes a digital signal processor engine with up to 100 MIPS of motor control that offers variable speeds, constant torque PI control and field oriented control. The dsPIC family also offers dual cores equipped with pulse-width modulation, analog-to-digital converters, programmable gate arrays and the capability for live firmware updates and provides permanent-magnet motors (see also Synchronous motor#Permanent-magnet motors), alternating current induction motor (see also induction motor) and brushless DC (see also Brushless DC electric motor) motor control in industrial, medical, automotive and consumer applications.

Embedded controllers and super I/O
Microchip Technology offers computer-related products including embedded controllers based on enhanced serial peripheral interface (eSPI) bus technology, Input/Output (I/O) devices, keyboard controllers and root of trust, secure boot and authentication and system management devices. Common applications include traditional computing applications (e.g., laptop computers) and embedded computing, such as interactive kiosks, networking equipment, and automated teller machines.

Memory products
Microchip Technology offers a wide-range of memory products that includes serial EEPROM, serial SRAM, serial flash, serial NvSRAM, serial EERAM, parallel EEPROM, parallel one-time programmable flash, parallel flash and CryptoMemory devices.

Programming and development tools
Microchip Technology offers a variety of programming tools and other tools to support the use of microcontrollers, digital signal controllers, and microprocessors. The MPLAB and Atmel Studio ecosystems include integrated development environments, compilers, configurators, programmers (e.g., MPLAB PICkit™), in-circuit emulators (e.g., MPLAB devices), and debuggers. A range of PIC devices support in-circuit programming (both for FLASH and OTP memory devices).

Security and authentication products
Microchip Technology offers crypto element devices that provide authentication, data integrity, and confidentiality in a variety of applications, such as disposables, accessories and nodes. The crypto element devices use ultra-secure, hardware-based cryptographic countermeasures including tamper detection.

Timing, communication and real-time clock and calendar products
Microchip Technology offers oscillators, clock generators, clock and data distribution products and real-time clock and calendar devices. The oscillator product line offer low jitter and low power online-configurable products with quartz-based or MEMS silicon-based resonator options. The clock generation product line offer online-configurable, single chip, multiple-frequency clock tree options. The clock and data distribution product line offers buffers, logic translators and multiplexers. The packet network synchronization product line includes ITU-T/IEEE® standards-compliant digital phase-locked loops for synchronous Ethernet as well as IEEE 1588 based applications. The real-time clock and calendar devices offer a battery back-up capability, digital timing, and on-board EEPROM and SRAM memory.

USB
USB products include smart hub controllers, power delivery and charging, transceivers/switches, flash memory controllers and security products.

Networking

Ethernet interface products 
Microchip Technology Ethernet products include Ethernet PHYs controllers for media-independent interface (MMI) interfacing, switches, controllers and bridge devices.

Wireless products 
Microchip Technology's offerings focus on lower-power operation designed for sensing or command and control products. Wireless products support Wi-Fi, Bluetooth, LoRa technology, IEEE 802.15.4 (e.g., Zigbee and MiWi wireless networking protocols) and proprietary 2.4 GHz and sub-GHz communication.

Power ICs 
Microchip Technology produce a wide range of Power Management Integrated Circuits (PMICs).

Product milestones
In April 2009, Microchip Technology announced the nanoWatt XLP microcontrollers, claiming the world's lowest sleep current. Microchip Technology had sold more than 6 billion microcontrollers as of 2009.
As of 2011, Microchip Technology ships over a billion processors every year. In September 2011, Microchip Technology shipped the 10 billionth PIC microcontroller.

Acquisitions

KeeLoq technology and patents
KeeLoq technology enhances security in wireless and remote controlled systems through the use of infrared, radio frequency, microwave transmission and secure smart cards, and may be used to enable keyless vehicle entry, garage doors openers, home security systems, pre-paid phone cards, electronic tagging, passive transponders, point of sale readers, and other applications. The KeeLoq technology, patents and marketing rights were acquired by Microchip Technology on November 20, 1995 from Nanoteq of South Africa for $10M in cash. Microchip Technology used the purchase to create the Secure Data Products Group.

Puyallup wafer facility
The Puyallup wafer facility located in Puyallup, Washington (near Tacoma) was a 92-acre semiconductor manufacturing complex owned by Matsushita Electric Industrial Company. Matsushita Electric purchased the facility in 1993 and ceased production in December 1998. Microchip Technology announced the execution of an agreement to buy the complex on May 24, 2000. Microchip Technology expected to hire 100 employees before year end and 1,000 employees in total. The new facility was expected to double Microchip Technology's manufacturing capacity and support about $1.5bn in annual sales. The $80M acquisition was completed on July 26, 2000. Microchip Technology's plans were never realized due to the early 2000s recession. As a result, the company put the facility up for sale for $94M. Microchip Technology announced the sale of the Puyallup facility, which had become known as Fab 3, on October 19, 2007 for $30M from an unsolicited offer.

TelCom Semiconductor
TelCom Semiconductor was a publicly traded company out of Mountain View, California that offered analog and mixed-signal products for a variety of applications, including power and thermal management. TelCom Semiconductor was spun out of Teledyne Industries in 1993 through a management buyout. Microchip Technology announced plans to purchase TelCom Semiconductor on October 27, 2000 in an all stock deal for $300M. The acquisition was intended to accelerate Microchip Technology's stand-alone analog integrated circuit offerings and enable the company to attach additional analog products to microcontroller sales. TelCom Semiconductor employed about 300 employees and, in 1999, posted $57.3M in revenue and $13.1 in net income.

Hampshire Company
Hampshire Company was a privately held company that sold large-format universal touch screen controller electronics and related software. Microchip Technology announced the acquisition of Hampshire Company on October 15, 2008. The terms of the deal are confidential. The acquisition was intended to extend Microchip Technology's expertise in universal touch screen controller technology and accelerate R&D efforts.

HI-TECH Software
HI-TECH Software was an Australian-based company that provides ANSI C compilers and development tools. Founded in 1984, the company is best known for its HI-TECH C PRO compilers with whole-program compilation technology, or Omniscient Code Generation (OCG). HI-TECH Software was bought by Microchip on 20 February 2009, whereupon it refocused its development effort exclusively on supporting Microchip products.

Supported manufacturers and architectures:
 Microchip PIC10, PIC12, PIC14, PIC16, PIC18, PIC24, PIC32 and dsPIC
 Cypress PSoC's
 Silicon Laboratories MCUs
 8051 MCUs
 Z80 for CP/M and Z80 cross compiler.

ZeroG Wireless
ZeroG Wireless, founded by Thomas H. Lee, was a fabless semiconductor company from Sunnyvale, California that was privately held and developed low-power, embedded Wi-Fi chips. On February 17, 2009, a partnership between ZeroG Wireless and Microchip Technology was announced for the production of ZeroG development kits designed to provide Wi-Fi capabilities for Microchip Technology's PIC microcontrollers. Microchip Technology announced the acquisition of ZeroG Wireless on January 11, 2010 for an undisclosed amount. The deal was intended to enhance Microchip Technology's wireless offerings by providing a Wi-Fi product for their PIC microcontrollers.

Silicon Storage Technology (SST)

Silicon Storage Technology, Inc. (SST) was a Sunnyvale, California, United States, technology company producing non-volatile memory devices and related products.
SST supplied NOR flash and other integrated circuits for high-volume applications.
Bing Yeh co-founded SST in August 1989, and served as its chief executive.
Starting in February 2010, private equity firm Cerberus Capital Management and public company Microchip Technology both made offers to acquire SST.
In April 2010, Microchip completed the acquisition for about $292M.
Microchip sold several SST flash memory assets to Greenliant Systems (founded by Yeh) in May of that year.

Ident Technology
Ident Technology AG was a German company that developed capacitive sensing technology. The acquisition of Ident Technology was revealed in Microchip Technology's fourth fiscal quarter (ending March 31, 2012) and full fiscal year financial results. The amount paid for the acquisition was not disclosed.

Roving Networks 
Roving Networks was a Los Gatos, California, United States, privately held, fabless semiconductor company that provided embedded low-power Wi-Fi and Bluetooth products, including some that connected to smartphones using the iOS and Android operating systems. In a confidential deal, Microchip Technology announced the acquisition of Roving Networks on April 19, 2012

Standard Microsystems Corporation

Standard Microsystems Corporation manufactured semiconductors including controllers for embedded networking, Ethernet controllers, and flash media cards. In August 2012, Microchip acquired Standard Microsystems Corporation (SMSC). Among SMSC's assets were those it had previously acquired from Symwave, a start-up that specialized in USB 3.0 chips, and two hi-fi wireless audio companies—Kleer Semiconductor and Wireless Audio IP BV.

Novocell Semiconductor
Novocell Semiconductor, Inc. offered non-volatile-memory intellectual property. Microchip Technology, through its Silicon Storage Technology (SST) subsidiary, signed a definitive agreement on June 3, 2013 to acquire Novocell Semiconductor. The terms of the agreement are confidential. The acquisition expanded the product portfolio of SST from a focus on high-density memory to also include low-density one-time programmable and multi-time programmable memory.

EqcoLogic
EqcoLogic was a privately held, fabless semiconductor company based out of Belgium that was spun out from Vrije Universiteit Brussel and sold equalizer and coaxial transceiver products. Microchip Technology announced the acquisition of EqcoLogic on February 10, 2014. The terms of the acquisition are confidential and were not expected to have a material impact on Microchip Technology's quarterly financials. The acquisition was expected to enhance Microchip Technology's penetration in the automotive and industrial markets for embedded applications.

ISSC Technologies

ISSC Technologies (ISSC) was a Taiwan based developer of Bluetooth system on chip products for wireless headset, speaker, connectivity and human interface device products. Microchip Technology announced the signing of a definitive agreement to acquire ISSC on May 22, 2014. The terms of the agreement stipulated that Microchip Technology would acquire all outstanding shares of ISSC for approximately $4.74 per share at a total equity value of about $328.5M and a total enterprise value of about $34.2M after accounting for ISSC's cash and investments. Microchip Technology announced the completion of its tend offer to acquire the outstanding shares of ISSC on July 14, 2014. The ISSC acquisition represents the first major overseas acquisition completed by Microchip Technology and was funded with the use of a portion of Microchip Technology's foreign cash.

Supertex
Supertex was a mixed signal semiconductor manufacturer that focused on high voltage analog and mixed signal products for use in the following industries: medical, LED lighting, display, industrial and telecommunications. Microchip Technology announced the execution of a definitive agreement to acquire Supertex, Inc. on February 10, 2014 for $33 per share in cash. The total equity value was $394M and the total enterprise value after excluding Supertex's cash and investments was approximately $148M. The acquisition was expected to expand Microchip Technology's expertise in high voltage analog and mixed signal technologies and reach into the medical, industrial and lighting industries. Microchip Technology announced the completion of the acquisition on April 1, 2014 with 98.4% of the Supertex shares that voted approving the merger.

Micrel

Micrel was a global manufacturer of integrated circuits focusing on the networking and consumer markets. Microchip Technology announced the signing of a definitive agreement to acquire Micrel for $14.00 a share on May 7, 2015. The price per share represented a 3% premium over Micrel's closing stock price on May 6, 2015 and a 30% premium at the close on August 7, 2014. The total equity value was about $839M. The completion of the acquisition was announced on August 3, 2015 with 98.5% of Micrel shares that voted approving the merger.

Atmel
Atmel was a designer and manufacturer of semiconductors focusing on selling microcontrollers. Microchip agreed to buy Atmel for $3.56bn in January 2016. JPMorgan Chase advised Microchip while Qatalyst Partners advised Atmel.

Microsemi

Microsemi manufactured semiconductors and system products for markets including aerospace and defense, communications, data centers, and industrial markets. In May 2018, Microchip acquired Microsemi Corporation.

Tekron International Limited (New Zealand)
In October 2020, Microchip Technology announced the acquisition of New Zealand-based Tekron International Limited. Founded in 2002, Tekron specialized in manufacturing GPS and precision timing devices. Microchip Technology intends to offer these products to "financial, data center, industrial, and communications clients." Financial and other terms were not publicly disclosed.

See also

 ATtiny microcontroller comparison chart
 AVR microcontrollers
 KeeLoq
 MiWi
 MPLAB devices
 MPLAB
 PIC microcontrollers
 PICkit
 UNI/O

References

External links

 
1993 initial public offerings
Companies based in Chandler, Arizona
Computer companies established in 1989
Computer memory companies
Electronics companies established in 1989
Manufacturing companies based in Arizona
Science and technology in Arizona
Semiconductor companies of the United States